The 1993 Asian Judo Championships were held in Portuguese Macau.

Medal overview

Men's events

Women's events

Medals table

References

External links
Judo Union of Asia

Asian Championships
Asian Judo Championships
1993 in Macau sport
Judo competitions in Macau
International sports competitions hosted by Macau